Margarites bisikovi is a species of sea snail, a marine gastropod mollusk in the family Margaritidae.

Description
The height of the shell attains 6 mm.

Distribution
This marine species occurs off the Kurile Islands, Russia and off Northern Japan.

References

 Kantor Yu.I. & Sysoev A.V. (2006) Marine and brackish water Gastropoda of Russia and adjacent countries: an illustrated catalogue. Moscow: KMK Scientific Press. 372 pp. + 140 pls. page(s): 32
 Hasegawa K. (2009) Upper bathyal gastropods of the Pacific coast of northern Honshu, Japan, chiefly collected by R/V Wakataka-maru. In: T. Fujita (ed.), Deep-sea fauna and pollutants off Pacific coast of northern Japan. National Museum of Nature and Science Monographs 39: 225–383.

External links

bisikovi
Gastropods described in 2000